Chiflik, or chiftlik (chiflik; , čiflig; , tsiflíki; /čitluk), is a Turkish term for a system of land management in the Ottoman Empire.  Before the chiflik system the Empire used a non-hereditary form of land management called the Timar System.  Starting as the Empire began to collapse, powerful military officers started to claim land from the Sultan's holding allowing them to pass the land onto their sons thus creating the Chiflik system.  This form of land management lasted from the sixteenth century to the collapse of the Ottoman Empire in 1919.

Background

In the Ottoman Empire before the Chiflik system was adopted the Timar system was official Ottoman policy.  The system was one in which the projected revenue of a conquered territory was distributed in the form of temporary land grants among the Sipahis (cavalrymen) and other members of the military class including Janissaries and other kuls (slaves) of the Sultan. These land grants were given as compensation for annual military service, for which they received no pay.  Timars could be small, granted by governors, or large which required a certificate from the Sultan but generally the fief had an annual value of less than twenty thousand akçes.  Although the military officers were granted land they did not have title which was retained by the Sultan.  If the military member died or left the land it reverted to the Sultan to be distributed to a new person.  Under this system the temporary owners could demand about three days labour per year from the peasants living on their land.  This is compared to two or three days a week under the Christian feudal system.

This system of land tenure lasted roughly from the fourteenth century through to the sixteenth century. As late as 1528 as much as 87% of the land was officially the Sultan's land, the rest belonging to religious organizations.  The goals of the system were necessitated by financial, state and expansionist purposes. The financial aims of the system were to relieve pressure from the Ottoman state of paying the army as well as to gain a new source of revenue for the central treasury.  However, the system only worked while new land was being won by advancing Ottoman armies.  When the Ottoman advance was halted in Europe and the Empire began to contract the Timar system began to collapse.

Adoption

With no new land to be divided up, the more powerful military commanders began to turn on the Ottoman Empire and its head of state the Sultan.  Instead of focusing on conquering outside forces these military officials started to carve up the Empire into private land holdings that the then weakened Ottoman Empire was forced to recognize their claims.  These new land holdings could be passed on to their sons.  Most of the chiflik rulers only controlled small land holdings but some like Ali Pasha of Ioannina ruled autonomous kingdoms inside the Empire.

Result

Previously, peasants that taxed under the Timar system enjoyed a relatively liberal system. Under the Chiflik system they were ruled as serfs.  No longer free to work for their own monetary gain they now had to labour under the rule of a feudal lord many days a week plus a larger percent of their harvest was seized.  This increased oppression often led to peasants migrating to areas away from Chiflik control, or in the case of Greek peasants to the mountains where Ottoman authority didn't exist.  The new oppressive system also increased peasant support for nationalist uprising against Ottoman rule in such places as the Balkans and Greece.

The Chiflik system began to wane in the 1910s as Balkan territories gained independence. In Macedonia, peasants seized control of Chiflik lands and began exporting tobacco through Greece. After the disintegration of the Ottoman Empire the transition from the Chiflik to others agricultural systems led to events like the Kileler incident.

The town of Al-Jiftlik

The name of the Palestinian town Al-Jiftlik on the West Bank is derived from the above system of 
land tenure, which was applied there as in many other Ottoman locations.

Bibliography

Notes

References

 - Total pages: 685 
 - Total pages: 207 
 - Total pages: 728 

 

Land management in the Ottoman Empire
Turkish words and phrases
Agriculture in the Ottoman Empire